Harlem on My Mind is a studio album by American jazz singer Catherine Russell, released on September 9, 2016. It earned Russell a Grammy Award nomination for Best Jazz Vocal Album.

Reception

Christopher Loudon of JazzTimes stated

Peter Vacher of London Jazz News wrote

Track listing

Personnel
Catherine Russell - lead vocals
Matt Munisteri - guitar, musical director
Tal Ronen - bass
Mark Shane - piano
Mark McLean - drums
with:
Andy Farber - tenor saxophone
Mark Lopeman - baritone saxophone
Dan Block - alto saxophone
Alphonso Horne, Jon-Erik Kellso - trumpet
John Allred - trombone
Fred Staton - tenor saxophone on "Don't Take Your Love from Me"

References

2016 albums
Catherine Russell (singer) albums